Dhahban Central Prison, also known as Dhahban Prison, is a maximum security prison facility located near Dahaban, Jeddah, in Saudi Arabia. It was built in 2015 as part of a renovation of the Jeddah Prisons infrastructure, at a cost of SR400 million. It has capacity for 7,500 inmates. When it opened, 3,000 inmates were transferred in from Braiman Prison. In 2015, the regional director for prisons Mani Al-Otaibi said it was the most advanced prison in Saudi Arabia, with state of the art surveillance technologies.

The facility is used to hold high profile political prisoners, as well as members of Al Qaeda and the Islamic State. It holds male and female prisoners, as well as some small children of female prisoners. It has been alleged that the female inmates have been tortured. Detained female activists were electrocuted and flogged repeatedly, according to Amnesty International, and Human Rights Watch. An anonymous Saudi official denied that torture was condoned by the state. Saudi Arabia claims that inmates get "top treatment".

The Badawi siblings are currently being held in this prison; with the Government of Canada demanding their release, and subsequently the Saudi Arabian Government expelled the Ambassador of Canada to Saudi Arabia and recalled the Ambassador of Saudi Arabia to Canada, along with diplomatic staff and Saudi Arabian students in Canada. Some of which have sought asylum as a result of this.

Allegations of torture 

Several Saudi Arabian activists, including women have been reported to be detained in the Dhahban Prison without any charges since May 2018. The activists have been repeatedly tortured by electrocution and flogging, leaving many of them unable to walk or even stand properly. According to the three testimonies obtained by Amnesty International, one of the activists was forced to hang from the ceiling. Another woman was subjected to repeated sexual harassment by interrogators, who wore masks over their faces. Despite the evidence presented by Human Rights Watch and Amnesty International, Saudi Arabia’s media ministry has denied all such allegations.

Post denial, on 28 November, another case of a fourth woman being tortured inside the prison was reported by Human Rights Watch. As per the report, Saudi authorities tortured the activist with electric shocks, tied her down to a steel bed and whipped her, while also being sexually harassed.

Notable inmates

In November 2018, prominent inmates detained in Dhahban Central Prison included: 

 Waleed Abulkhair
 Raif Badawi
 Samar Badawi
 Nassima al-Sadah
 Loujain al-Hathloul (In al-Ha'ir Prison by February 2019)
 Iman al-Nafjan
 Aziza al-Yousef

See also 
 Al-Ha'ir Prison
 ʽUlaysha Prison

References 

Prisons in Saudi Arabia
2015 establishments in Saudi Arabia
Crime in Saudi Arabia
Women's rights in Saudi Arabia
Human rights abuses in Saudi Arabia
Torture in Saudi Arabia